Batrachorhina similis is a species of beetle in the family Cerambycidae. It was described by Stephan von Breuning in 1938.

Subspecies
 Batrachorhina similis similis Breuning, 1938
 Batrachorhina similis supplementaria Breuning, 1970

References

Batrachorhina
Beetles described in 1938